Bin Umran is a village in Muscat, in northeastern Oman.

References

Populated places in the Muscat Governorate